Česko hledá SuperStar is the Czech version of the Idol series. It is broadcast on Czech TV Nova, first series in spring 2004, the second a year later, the third series in autumn 2006. The show was very popular in 2004, with an audience of more than 3.5 million people (35% of the country's population) and a large amount of media attention. The further series' rating were rather lower. In 2008, the program was superseded by the X Factor. However, Czech broadcaster TV Nova and the broadcaster of the Slovak version of Idol, TV Markíza, confirmed that both versions would be joined into one. The latest version is called Česko Slovenská Superstar ("Czech(o) Slovak Superstar"), which started in September 2009.

Series overview

Season one (2004)

Finalists
(ages stated at time of contest)

Elimination chart

The results of the first series were (the vote numbers are for the last night when the contestants were eliminated):

The finalists also recorded SuperStar TOP 10, an album that includes 3 songs that they sing together. Two of the three are by TOP 10, "Veď mě dál" (Lead me on) and Superstar. The TOP 5 sing together "Hvězdy" (Stars). Their first single is "Veď mě dál" with 4 versions on the CD single.

Season two (2005)
There were twelve finalists instead of previous ten, with two eliminated on the first evening. They recorded the SuperStar Top 12 album that includes the single "Hvězda snů" (Star of dreams) that has 4 versions on the CD Single. The winner Vlastimil Horváth's Romani origin (common with Martina Balogová in first series) was widely noted.

Finalists
(ages stated at time of contest)

Elimination chart

Season three (2006)
Season three premiered on 27 August 2006, with the finals (back to 10 in number) starting on Sunday 22 October. The voting always took place for a whole day until the results announcement on Monday evening.

Finalists
(ages stated at time of contest)

Elimination chart

Notes

References

External links
 Official webpage 
 http://superstar2004.nova.cz, http://superstar2005.nova.cz - previous series
 Fan pages with complete results of first 2 series 

Music competitions in the Czech Republic
Idols (franchise)
TV Nova (Czech TV channel) original programming
Television series by Fremantle (company)
2004 Czech television series debuts
2006 Czech television series endings
Czech television series based on British television series
Czech reality television series
Czech music television series